Şahabettin Mert Fırat (born 10 January 1981) is a Turkish actor and screenwriter.

Life
Fırat is of Turkish, Circassian and Arab descent. His father is singer Nihat Fırat. After finishing high school, he studied radio and television broadcasting in Sweden. He then returned to Ankara and took acting classes in Ankara University. Fırat graduated from the theatre department of Ankara University and took his master's degree in Film and Drama from Kadir Has University. He founded the "Moda Theatre" and "Das Das" in Istanbul, and "Sanat Mahal" in Bursa. He has appeared in more than fifteen films since 2005 and has won many awards. In October 2017 the United Nations Development Programme (UNDP) Turkey chose Fırat as a Goodwill Ambassador in Turkey.

Filmography

Screenwriter
Başka Dilde Aşk (2009)
Atlıkarınca (2010)
Bir Varmış Bir Yokmuş (2015)

Actor 
Movies
 İşte Benim (2006) – Ali
 Hayattan Korkma (2007) – Engin
 Başka Dilde Aşk (2009) – Onur
 Atlıkarınca (2010) – Erdem
 Beni Unutma (2011) – Sinan
 Dedemin İnsanları (2011) – Hasan
 Devrimden Sonra (2011) – Köylü Genç
 Unutma Beni İstanbul (2011)
 Kelebeğin Rüyası (2013) – Rüştü Onur
 Erkek Tarafı Testosteron (2013) – Tankut
 The Water Diviner (2014) – Ordu Görevlisi
 Gece (2014) – Yusuf
 Bir Varmış Bir Yokmu (2015) – Ozan
 Yol Ayrımı (2017)
 Her Şey Seninle Güzel (2018)
 Karanlık Şehir Hikayeleri: Kilit (2021)

Series
 Bizim Evin Halleri (2000) – Bora
 Binbir Gece (2006–2008) – Burak İnceoğlu
 Yersiz Yurtsuz (2007) – Hüseyin
 Kapalıçarşı (2009–2010) – Arda Güler
 Bir Ömür Yetmez (2011) – Ali Akyol
 İntikam (2013–2014) – Emre Arsoy
 Serçe Sarayı (2015) – Kadir
 Aşk ve Gurur (2017) – Kenan
 Ufak Tefek Cinayetler (2017–2018) – Serhan Aksak
 Kefaret (2020–2021) – Sinan
 İlginç Bazı Olaylar (2021) – Tolgay (guest appearance)
 Aşk 101 (2021) – Kerem (adult)

Theatre
Hastalık Hastası (1999–2000, Söder Theatre, İsveç)
Suç ve Ceza (2001–2004 Ankara Devlet Tiyatrosu)
Şeyh Bedrettin (2002–2003, Ankara Devlet Tiyatrosu)
Palyaço Prens (2003–2004, Ankara Devlet Tiyatrosu)
Atları da Vururlar (2004–2005, Ankara Devlet Tiyatrosu)
Hırçın Kız (2006–2007, Oyun Atölyesi) – Tranio
Testosteron (2008–2012, Oyun Atölyesi) – Tretyn
Antonius ile Kleopatra (2012, Oyun Atölyesi) – Caesar
Bütün Çılgınlar Sever Beni (2013–) – Janus
Parkta Güzel Bir Gün (2014–) – Sınır Muhafızı
En Kısa Gecenin Rüyası (2015–) – Dimitrius
Joseph k (DasDas, İstanbul)
Westend / Batının Sonu (DasDas, İstanbul)
deli bayrami (DasDas, İstanbul)

Commercial
''İş Bankası  Maximum Kart

References

External links
 
 
 Entry in Sinema Türk

1981 births
Living people
Male actors from Ankara
Turkish Arab people
Turkish people of Arab descent
Turkish male film actors
Turkish male screenwriters
Turkish people of Circassian descent
21st-century Turkish male actors